Living in Bondage is a 1992/93 Nigerian two-part drama thriller film directed by Chris Obi Rapu, written by Kenneth Nnebue and Okechukwu Ogunjiofor, produced by Ogunjiofor, and sponsored by Jafac Wine.
The film was shot straight-to-video, and starred Kenneth Okonkwo and Nnenna Nwabueze in their breakout roles. It is regarded as the first Nigerian home video which achieved blockbuster success.

In August 2015, Charles Okpaleke acquired the rights to Living in Bondage for a period of ten years under his production company Play Entertainment Network. On November 2, 2019, the highly anticipated sequel, Living in Bondage: Breaking Free, premiered in Lagos.

Plot
Andy Okeke (Kenneth Okonkwo) and his wife Merit (Nnenna Nwabueze) face several obstacles – redundancy,  infidelity, loss of savings via a bogus investment, and indecent proposals from lecherous men, including Merit's boss Ichie Million (Francis Agu) and Chief Omego (Kanayo O. Kanayo). Andy constantly compares his lack of fortune to the success of his peers, especially his old friend Paul (Okechukwu Ogunjiofor). Despite Merit's support and patience, Andy is driven to near-depression, determined to obtain wealth by any means possible, and the slick-talking Paul reveals his secret – a satanic cult where members pledge their loyalty to Lucifer and kill their loved ones in ritualised sacrifices, gaining enormous wealth in return. After much hesitation, Andy reluctantly agrees to sacrifice the one person he loves the most – Merit. She dies in hospital days after the ritual, but not before she curses her husband's betrayal.

Andy's sudden affluence and subsequent remarriage three months after Merit's death raise suspicion from his former in-laws, who accuse him of murdering their daughter. He  also encounters new problems – the paparazzi's constant interference in his life, his new wife Ego (Ngozi Nwosu) fleeing with his money after he collapses at their traditional wedding, and  Merit's ghost haunting and terrorising him when he least expects. Andy would later enter a common-law union with Chinyere (Jennifer Okere), another woman introduced to him by Merit's former friend Caro (Ngozi Nwaneto), but she meets her untimely death after Caro poisons her friend and attempts to escape abroad with the cash Chinyere steals from her husband. Caro is also killed by a hit-and-run driver on her way to the airport, and Paul is murdered by hitmen after Andy holds him partially responsible for his involvement with the cult.

A now frustrated Andy asks the satanic cult for help, but when the Chief Priest (Daniel Oluigbo) insists he can only pacify his late wife's spirit by blinding and castrating himself, he refuses and becomes mentally deranged, living as a vagrant under a Lagos flyover until Tina (Rita Nzelu) – a former prostitute Andy had previously presented to the cult as a decoy before his deceit was exposed – takes him to her church. He finally confesses to Merit's murder, and Andy's mother (Grace Ayozie) weeps at her late daughter-in-law's grave, pleading for her forgiveness.

In the film's final scene Andy, now cured of his insanity, worships with the evangelical Christians who have assured him his sins are forgiven.

Cast
Kenneth Okonkwo as Andy Okeke
Nnenna Nwabueze as Merit, Andy's wife
Kanayo O. Kanayo as Chief Omego, cult member
Francis Agu as Ichie Million, cult member and Merit's boss
Okechukwu Ogunjiofor as Paul, Andy's friend and cult member
Ngozi Nwaneto as Caro, Merit's friend and Paul's girlfriend
Ngozi Nwosu as Ego, Andy's mistress
Felicia Mayford as Obidia
Clement Offiaji as Robert, fraudster
Chizoba Bosah as Merit's aunt
Bob-Manuel Udokwu as Mike, cult member
Sydney Diala as cult member/initiator
Daniel Oluigbo as cult chief priest 
Obiageli Molugbe as cult mother
Rita Nzelu as Tina, local prostitute
Jennifer Okere as Chinyere, Caro's friend
Ruth Osu as Andy and Merit's neighbour
Grace Ayozie as Andy's mother
Benjamin Nwosu as Andy's father
Actors Kanayo, Agu, Udokwu, Molugbe, and Osu were already established actors from the soap opera Checkmate, and Okere had a regular role in rival soap Ripples; their appearance helped generate publicity for the movie.
Nwabueze, Nwosu, and Ogunjiofor were the only main actors not to reprise their roles for the second part of the movie. Nwabueze's character Merit appears in a flashback scene, but a body double plays her ghost. Paul's name is mentioned numerous times in part two but he never appears on-screen; his death scene is also filled in by a body double.

Sequel
In 2015, veteran actor Ramsey Nouah and Charles Okpaleke acquired the rights to Living In Bondage from Kenneth Nnebue for a possible remake to be filmed in Europe and America as well as Nigeria. The news was later confirmed on Instagram, but the project languished in development hell for three years.

In 2018, Nouah announced his remake had transitioned into a sequel now titled Living in Bondage: Breaking Free, and was released on November 8, 2019, becoming the 11th highest-grossing Nigerian movie. Nouah, who plays the cult's new chief priest, makes his directorial debut, with original actors Okonkwo, Kanayo, and Udokwu, 
also involved (Udokwu's character was reduced to a single cameo). The story centres on Andy's son Nnamdi, and his vaunting quest for wealth like his father before him. Former MBGN Muna Abii makes her acting debut alongside Swanky JKA in his breakout role.

Following its cinematic release, the film premiered on Netflix in May 2020.

See also
 List of Nigerian films of 1992
 List of Nigerian films of 1993

References

External links
 

1992 films
1990s thriller drama films
Nigerian thriller drama films
Igbo-language films
Direct-to-video drama films
1992 direct-to-video films
1992 drama films